A nasal voice is a type of speaking voice characterized by speech with a "nasal" quality. It can also occur naturally because of genetic variation.  

Nasal speech can be divided into hypo-nasal and hyper-nasal.

Hyponasal speech
Hyponasal speech, denasalization or rhinolalia clausa is a lack of appropriate nasal airflow during speech, such as when a person has nasal congestion.

Some causes of hyponasal speech are adenoid hypertrophy, allergic rhinitis, deviated septum, sinusitis, myasthenia gravis and turbinate hypertrophy.

Hypernasal speech
Hypernasal speech or hyperrhinolalia or rhinolalia aperta is inappropriate increased airflow through the nose during speech, especially with syllables beginning with plosive and fricative consonants. 

Examples of hypernasal speech include cleft palate and velopharyngeal insufficiency.

References

External links
 Nasal Speech Section of VoiceInfo.org
 An example of a nasally voice can be found here: 

Phonetics
Voice